Lists of monasteries cover monasteries, buildings or complexes of buildings comprising the domestic quarters and workplaces of monastics, monks or nuns, whether living in communities or alone (hermits). The lists are organized by country or territory, by denomination, by order and by form.

By country or territory

 Monasteries in Armenia
 Monasteries in Australia
 Monasteries in Austria
 Monasteries in Belgium
 Monasteries in Denmark
 Monasteries in England
 Monasteries in Estonia
 Monasteries in Finland
 Monasteries in France
 Monasteries in Germany
  Greece
Monasteries in Meteora
 Monasteries in Hungary
 Monasteries in Ireland
 Monasteries in Malta
 Monasteries in Norway
 Monasteries in Romania
Monasteries in Bucharest
 Monasteries in Russia
 Monasteries in Scotland
 Monasteries in Serbia
Monasteries on Fruška Gora
 Monasteries in Spain
Monasteries in Madrid
 Monasteries in Sweden
 Monasteries in Switzerland
 Monasteries in Syria
 Monasteries in Tibet
 Monasteries in the United States
 Monasteries in Wales

By denomination

Christian monasteries 
Orthodox monasteries
 List of Romanian Orthodox monasteries
 List of Russian Orthodox monasteries
 List of Serbian Orthodox monasteries
List of monasteries of the Ukrainian Orthodox Church (Moscow Patriarchate)

Buddhist monasteries 
 List of Tibetan monasteries

By order 
 List of Carthusian monasteries
 List of Cistercian monasteries

By form
List of cave monasteries

See also

Monastery
List of abbeys and priories